United Biscuits (UB) is a British multinational food manufacturer, makers of McVitie's biscuits, Jacob's Cream Crackers, and Twiglets. The company was listed on the London Stock Exchange and was once a constituent of the FTSE 100 Index. In November 2014, the company was acquired by Yıldız Holding and is now part of Pladis.

United Biscuits manufactures in a number of countries across Europe, such as the Netherlands, France and Belgium. It also has a manufacturing site in India. Its company's headquarters is in Chiswick Business Park in West London.

History
United Biscuits (UB) was formed in 1948 by a merger of two Scottish family businesses: McVitie & Price and MacFarlane Lang. In 1962, William Crawford & Sons, a business founded in Leith, Edinburgh in 1813 which was best known for its shortbread, was acquired by United Biscuits for £6 million. In 1965, the company also acquired William MacDonald & Sons for £2.8 million, and brought the Penguin brand to the group.

The company was listed on the London Stock Exchange as United biscuits plc on 27 July 1948.

In 1972, United Biscuits acquired Carr's of Carlisle, makers of Table Water biscuits, from James Goldsmith's Cavenham Foods for £2.75 million. Two years later in 1974, it acquired the US-based Keebler Company for $53 million. It also owned the Wimpy Bar fast food restaurant chain between 1977 and 1989.

United Biscuits acquired the frozen food company Ross Young's from Hanson in 1988 for £335 million.

It sold Keebler for $500 million in 1995 after giving up efforts to break into the American market.

United Biscuits was de-listed from the London Stock Exchange and acquired in May 2000 by Finalrealm, a consortium of financial investors, as well as Nabisco Holdings Corporation. As part of the transaction, UB acquired Nabisco's European businesses and divested several part of its international business in Scandinavia, continental Europe, Asia (Keebler Malaysia and Singapore), several brands including TUC and 70% shareholding in Fazer Keksit (Biscuit) in Finland to Groupe Danone and Far East (China, Hong Kong, and Taiwan) to Nabisco. The company sold Young's Bluecrest in 2001, in order to concentrate on the sweet biscuit sector. In September 2004, United Biscuits bought the UK portion of Groupe Danone's Jacob's Biscuit Group for £240 million, including Cream Crackers and Twiglets. In July 2006, the company sold its Southern European biscuits business to Kraft Foods, which in turn left the owner syndicate. 

In October 2006, MidOcean Partners sold the company to a consortium made up of the Blackstone Group and PAI Partners. The deal was completed in December 2006.

In December 2012 UB agreed the sale of its KP Snacks business to Intersnack for £500 million. On 3 November 2014, private equity funds managed by Blackstone and PAI Partners announced the sale of United Biscuits to Yıldız Holding.

Operations
The core of the business is in the United Kingdom, where it produces biscuits under a number of brand names including: McVitie's biscuits and Jacob's Cream Crackers.

The company manufactures in a number of countries across Europe, such as the Netherlands, France and Belgium. It also has a manufacturing site in India.

The company's headquarters is in Chiswick Business Park in West London. The company's main UK distribution centre is at Ashby-de-la-Zouch.

Brands

 Carr's
 Crawfords
 Tasties
 Delacre
 Verkade
 Go ahead!
 Wing Dings
 Flipper Dipper

Jacob's

 Biscuits for Cheese
 Mini Cheddars
 Cheddars
 Cheeselets
 Choice Grain
 Cornish Wafer
 Cream Crackers
 Essentials Crackers
 Mediterraneo
 Thai Bites
 Water Biscuits
 Twiglets
 Crinklys
 Oddities
 TUC (UK market only)

McVities

 Ginger Nuts
 Digestives
 Hobnobs
 BN
 Rich Tea
 Penguin
 Taxi
 Lyle's
 Mini Rolls
 Club
 Gold
 Iced Gems
 Happy Faces
 Jaffa Cakes
United (discontinued)

United Biscuits Network
The United Biscuits Network, a closed-circuit radio network serving their factories across the UK which was active from 1970 to 1979, spawned the career of UK radio presenter Steve Allen and TV and radio personality Dale Winton.

In popular culture
In his 2009 book The Pleasures and Sorrows of Work, Alain de Botton chronicles his tour and brief experiences with employees of United Biscuits as they launched the "Moments" biscuit line.

See also
 Burton's Biscuit Company
 Huntley & Palmers
 Jacob Fruitfield Food Group
 Jaffa Cakes
 Peek Freans
 Tunnock's

References

External links

1948 establishments in England
 
Companies formerly listed on the London Stock Exchange
Snack food manufacturers of the United Kingdom
History of the London Borough of Hammersmith and Fulham
Food and drink companies established in 1948
British companies established in 1948
Yıldız Holding
2006 mergers and acquisitions
2014 mergers and acquisitions
British subsidiaries of foreign companies